Barboza is a surname of Portuguese or Hispanic origin that may refer to:
Agustín Barboza (1913–1998), Paraguayan singer and composer
Ana Teresa Barboza (born 1981), Peruvian textile artist
Arnold Barboza Jr. (born 1991), American boxer
Celia Barboza (born 1977), Uruguayan surfer
Cynthia Barboza (born 1987), American volleyball player
Edson Barboza (born 1986), Brazilian mixed martial arts fighter
Jessica Barboza (born 1987), Venezuelan beauty queen
Joseph "The Animal" Barboza (1932–1976), Portuguese-American mobster and hit man
Omar Barboza (born 1944), Venezuelan politician, opponent of Hugo Chávez

Barboza is a sephardic surname. Sephardic names from the book, "A Origem Judaica dos Brasileiros", by Jose Geraldo Rodrigues de Alckmin Filho, who personally provided the text. This publication contains a list of 517 Sephardic families punished by the inquisition in Portugal and Brazil. As familias punidas pela Inquidicao em Portugal e no Brasil.

https://jewishgen.org/databases/sephardic/SephardimComNames.html

See also
 Barbosa (disambiguation)

Portuguese-language surnames
Spanish-language surnames